A military hospital is a hospital owned and operated by a military. They are often reserved for the use of military personnel and their dependents, but in some countries are made available to civilians as well. They may or may not be located on a military base; many are not.

In the United Kingdom and Germany, British military hospitals have been closed; military personnel are usually treated in a special wing of a designated civilian hospital, in the UK, these are referred to as a Ministry of Defence Hospital Unit. Service personnel injured in combat operations are normally treated at the Royal Centre for Defence Medicine.

Examples

Asia

Azerbaijan

 Central Clinical Hospital
Baku Military Garrison Hospital
 Military Hospital of Frontiers
 Central Customs Hospital
 Hospital of the Ministry of Internal Affairs
 Central Military Hospital
 Military Hospital of the Ministry of National Security
 Polyclinic of the Army Medical Department of the Ministry of National Security

China 

 Nanjing General Hospital of People's Liberation Army
 301st General Hospital of the Chinese PLA
 307th General Hospital of the Chinese PLA

Indonesia 

 Gatot Soebroto Army Hospital, Jakarta

Jordan 
 King Hussein Medical Center, Amman - Jordan

Mongolia 

 Central Military Hospital, Ulanabaatar - Mongolia

Taiwan 
 Tri-Service General Hospital, Taipei - Taiwan
 Kaohsiung Armed Forces General Hospital, Kaohsiung - Taiwan

Africa

Kenya 
Gilgil Regional Military Hospital

Ghana 
37 Military Hospital
Kumasi Military Hospital

Europe

United Kingdom

Other European hospitals 

 Military Medical Academy, Belgrade
 St Bricin's Military Hospital, Dublin

Americas 
 Belize Hospital
 Brooke Army Medical Center, U.S.
 Carlos J. Finlay Military Hospital, Cuba
 Central Hospital of the Armed Forces of Uruguay
 Tripler Army Medical Center, U.S.
 Walter Reed National Military Medical Center, U.S.

Gallery
Pictures of Israeli military hospital in 1948.

See also

Military Health System
Royal Naval Hospital

References